Matías Cresseri Valerio (born 15 February 1980) is a Uruguayan former footballer who last played for Plaza Colonia in the Uruguayan Segunda División.

Career
Cresseri began his career playing with River Plate Montevideo in 1999.

In his career, he has also  played in the first division of his country, with El Tanque Sisley, Central Español, Danubio and Bella Vista.

In July 2010, he was transferred to Primera División Venezolana side Aragua FC.

In January 2011, he signed a new deal with Salvadoran side Club Deportivo Águila.

References

External links
 
 Soccerway profile

1980 births
Living people
Uruguayan footballers
Association football midfielders
Club Atlético River Plate (Montevideo) players
El Tanque Sisley players
C.A. Bella Vista players
Central Español players
Danubio F.C. players
Plaza Colonia players
C.D. Águila footballers
Aragua FC players
Expatriate footballers in El Salvador
Expatriate footballers in Venezuela